Brian McTernan is an American musician and record producer from Baltimore, Maryland. McTernan was the lead vocalist in the hardcore punk band Battery, the guitarist in Ashes, and is the singer in Be Well.  In 2009, he was named one of "the 50 most influential people in Maryland" by the editors of The Daily Record.

McTernan operates the recording studio Salad Days from his home in Beltsville, Maryland. His studio is named after the Minor Threat song of the same name. He has produced albums for several notable artists, including Thrice, Circa Survive, Hot Water Music, Senses Fail, and Turnstile. In 2003, he formed Salad Days Records, a record label affiliated with Atlantic Records, through which he signed and released music by Moments in Grace.

Early life 
McTernan was born in Bethesda, Maryland. He had a troubled youth, which he addressed on Battery's 2017 song "My Last Breath". He dropped out of high-school at the age of 17 to tour with Battery.

Musician 
McTernan joined Ken Olden, Matt Squire, Toshi Yano and Zac Eller to form Battery in 1990. Originally called "Fury", the band released its first record in 1991 on Deadlock Records.  In 2017, the band reunited releasing a compilation, For The Rejected By The Rejected, and toured Europe.

Producer
In 1994, McTernan moved to Boston to be near his future wife who studied at Harvard University. He started his recording studio "Salad Days", when he was 18 years old, naming it after a song by Minor Threat from their 1985 Salad Days EP, in the basement of the house he shared with six roommates. 

McTernan went on to build Salad Days recording studio.

References

 
Living people
Date of birth missing (living people)
Musicians from Baltimore
People from Bethesda, Maryland
Hardcore punk musicians
Record producers from Maryland
Year of birth missing (living people)
Biology (band) members
Battery (hardcore punk band) members
Miltown (band) members